Louchébem or loucherbem is Parisian and Lyonnaise butchers' (French boucher) slang, similar to Pig Latin and Verlan. It originated in the mid-19th century and was in common use until the 1950s.

Process
The louchébem word-creation process resembles that of largonji, verlan, and javanais, in that existing words are camouflaged according to a set of rules. Strictly speaking, louchébem is a more rigid variety of largonji in which the ending -èm is obligatory.

Note that louchébem is first and foremost an oral language, and spelling is usually phoneticized.

History

Despite the name, louchébem seems to have been created not by butchers, but by inmates at Brest Prison, with records dating back to 1821.

Edmund Clerihew Bentley used the language as a plot point in his 1937 short story "The Old-Fashioned Apache".

During the Nazi occupation louchébem was used by Parisian members of the Resistance.

Even today, louchébem is still well-known and used among those working at point-of-sale in the meat retail industry.  Some words have even leaked into common, everyday use by the masses; an example is the word loufoque, meaning "eccentric".

Examples 
Here are a few example Louchébem words.

There is another French argot called largonji, which differs from louchébem only in the suffix that is added (-i instead of -em); the term is derived from jargon.

Notes

Bibliography
 Marcel Schwob, Étude sur l’argot français. Paris: Émile Bouillon, 1889.

External links
 

French slang
Occupational cryptolects
Language games
Cant languages